Haustellotyphis wendita is a species of sea snail, a marine gastropod mollusk in the family Muricidae, the murex snails or rock snails.

Description

Distribution

References

 C. M. Hertz (1995) A Second Species of Haustellotyphis (Gastropoda: Typhidae) from Costa Rica Biology.

Haustellotyphis
Gastropods described in 1995